Søren Jensen (born 1957) is a Danish sculptor and photographer.

Born in Copenhagen, he graduated from the Royal Danish Academy of Fine Arts in 1986.

His works are displayed at the National Museum of Art and the Trapholt Art Museum  as well as at several other buildings, including Elsinore City Hall, Hvidovre Town Hall, TDC's headquarters in the South Harbour in Copenhagen and Nordea's headquarters at Christianshavn.

From 1999 to 2005, Jensen was Rector of the Funen Art Academy in Odense.

His work explores the spatial relationships between sculpture and architecture. In 2004 he was awarded the Eckersberg Medal by the Royal Danish Academy of Fine Arts.

References

1957 births
Living people
Artists from Copenhagen
Danish sculptors
Danish male artists
Danish photographers
20th-century Danish photographers
21st-century Danish photographers
Recipients of the Eckersberg Medal
Royal Danish Academy of Fine Arts alumni
Male sculptors